Yvonne Frank (born 7 February 1980) is a German field hockey player.

References

External links
 

1980 births
Living people
German female field hockey players
Female field hockey goalkeepers
Field hockey players at the 2012 Summer Olympics
Olympic field hockey players of Germany
21st-century German women